Lucetta "Lucy" Dunn is an attorney and business leader in Orange County, California, and President and CEO of Orange County Business Council (OCBC).

Career
Lucy Dunn graduated from California State University, Fullerton in Political Science in 1976 and Western State University College of Law in 1981. From 1981–87 she managed her own private practice of law, the Law Offices of Lucetta A. Dunn, which sprung from her paralegal practice which she developed while attending law school. In 1987, she joined Signal Landmark, a real estate development company, as vice president and assistant general counsel, then briefly as general counsel, but in 1990 moved to the business side as vice president of development and project management of 1700 acres of land on the Pacific Coast, surrounding by the City of Huntington Beach, known as Bolsa Chica.

Dunn was appointed president and CEO of the Orange County Business Council in 2005, where she heads an organization of business leaders, working with government and academia, to ensure the county's economic prosperity and high quality of life. Before joining the Business Council, Dunn was appointed by Governor Arnold Schwarzenegger in 2004 to serve as Director of the California Department of Housing and Community Development. In June 2008, Governor Schwarzenegger appointed her to the California Transportation Commission and in March 2012, Governor Jerry Brown appointed her to serve a second term. In 2012, she was appointed by the Ontario City Council to the board of the newly created Ontario International Airport Authority.

She is a former secretary of the California Building Industry Association, former director of the National Association of Home Builders and a former member of the Urban Land Institute.

Dunn is a director of a number of nonprofit organizations including Pacific Symphony, the Lennar Charitable Housing Foundation, and a founder of the Bolsa Chica Conservancy; she was a participant in the creation of the Orange County 10 Year Plan to End Homelessness.

Honors and awards
Dunn has received numerous honors and awards. 
2006: "Women in Business" award by Orange County Business Journal
2007: "Vision and Visionary" award from Cal-State University, Fullerton 
2010: "Woman of distinction Ruby Award" from Soroptimist Huntington Beach
2011: "20 Women to Watch" OC Metro July 2011 Edition  
2011: "Private Sector Leader of the Year" award from Mobility 21 
2012: "Private Sector Partner of the year" award from Southern California Association of Governments
2012: "Person of the Year" award from the California Transportation Foundation
2013: "Excellence in Executive Leadership" award from the Center for Leadership at Cal-State University, Fullerton.

Member Of
 CEO of Orange County Business Council
 Board Member of OC Moves Committee
 Board Member of Mobility 21
 Board Member of Jamboree Housing Advisory Board
 Board Member of Coto de Caza Planning Commission
 Commissioner of California Transportation Commission
Trustee for the UCI Foundation
Adviser to the Southern California Association of Governments (SCAG)
Partner Association of California Cities - Orange County
Summit Steering Committee of the California Economic Summit 
Board Secretary for the Orange County Taxpayers Association
Chair for the Road Charge Technical Advisory Committee (TAC)
Member of California Coastal Commission
Founding co-chair of the R.E.A.L. coalition
Founding co-chair of HOMEFUL

References

Living people
Year of birth missing (living people)
People from Orange County, California
California State University, Fullerton alumni
California lawyers